Kazakhstan national amateur boxing athletes represents Kazakhstan in regional, continental and world boxing tournaments and matches sanctioned by the International Boxing Association (AIBA).

Asian Games

2006 Doha Asian Games

10 amateur boxers represented Kazakhstan in this edition of the Asiad. This country is ranked 5th with a gold medal, two silver medals and three bronze medals.

Entry list

 Kanat Abutalipov (Bantamweight)
 Bakhtiyar Artayev (Middleweight) - Silver
 Mukhtarkhan Dildabekov (Super Heavyweight) - Silver
 Dmitriy Gotfrid (Heavyweight) - Bronze
 Galib Jafarov (Featherweight) - Bronze

 Yerdos Janabergenov (Light Heavyweight)
 Berik Kaliyev (Lightweight)
 Serik Sapiyev (Light Welterweight) - Bronze
 Bakhyt Sarsekbayev (Welterweight) - Gold
 Mirat Sarsembayev (Flyweight)

Olympics

2004 Athens Olympics

Entry list

References

Amateur boxing
Boxing in Kazakhstan